Procecidochares pleuritica is a species of tephritid or fruit flies in the genus Procecidochares of the family Tephritidae.

Distribution
Paraguay.

References

Tephritinae
Insects described in 1914
Diptera of South America
Procecidochares